Jean Pecquet (9 May 1622, Dieppe, Seine-Maritime – 26 February 1674) was a French scientist. He studied the expansion of air, wrote on psychology, and is also known for investigating the thoracic duct. Furthermore, he studied the nature of vision.

Life

Jean Pecquet studied medicine at Montpellier, where he investigated the important discovery (in 1622, by Gaspare Aselli) of the course of the lacteal vessels, including the receptaculum chyli (or reservoir of Pecquet, as it is sometimes called) and the termination of the principal lacteal vessel, the thoracic duct, into the left subclavian vein. He dissected the eye and measured its dimensions. Contrary to Edme Mariotte, he maintained that the retina, not the choroid, was the principal organ of vision.

Selected written works
 Experimenta Nova Anatomica (Paris, 1651;  English translation, as New Anatomical Experiments, 1653)
 De Circulatione Sanguinis et Chyli Motu (1653)
 De Thoracicis Lacteis (1653)
 Nouvelle découverte touchant la veüe (Paris, 1668) (With Frederic Leonard)

Terms
 Pecquet, cistern of, reservoir of  — The receptaculum chyli.

References

 Lewis, Sarah Janvier. Jean Pecquet (1622–1674) and the Thoracic duct. PhD thesis. Yale Univ. 2003.
 Pecquet, Jean. New anatomical experiments. LONDON; t.w. Octavian, 1653.

External links

Medicine page
Princeton
Northwestern University

1622 births
1674 deaths
People from Dieppe, Seine-Maritime
French anatomists
Members of the French Academy of Sciences
French science writers
French male non-fiction writers
Prisoners of the Bastille